Ignacio Elosu (born 31 October 1980) is a rugby union player whose principal position is prop. He has previously played for Exeter Chiefs in Premiership Rugby and he joined Esher RFC in the RFU Championship from Exeter in the summer of 2011.

References

External links
 Aviva Premiership Player Profile

1980 births
Living people
Argentine rugby union players
Exeter Chiefs players
Rugby union players from Buenos Aires
Argentine expatriate sportspeople in England
Argentine expatriate sportspeople in Hong Kong
Argentine expatriate sportspeople in Italy
Argentine expatriate sportspeople in France
Rugby union props
Argentine expatriate rugby union players
Expatriate rugby union players in England
Expatriate rugby union players in Italy
Expatriate rugby union players in Hong Kong
Castres Olympique players
Rugby Viadana players
Harlequin F.C. players
Tarbes Pyrénées Rugby players
Esher RFC players